Acton is a village and civil parish in the English county of Suffolk. The parish also includes the hamlets of Cuckoo Tye and Newman's Green.

Etymology
According to Eilert Ekwall the meaning of the name is "Village by the Oaks".

History
The Domesday Book records the population of Acton in 1086 to be 83 households along with 50 acres for farming, wood for 40 pigs, 1 mill, 11 horses at hall, 31 cattle, 160 pigs, 423 sheep, and 7 beehives. The land was held by Ranulf Peverel, before the Norman Conquest, the village was held by Siward Barn.

All Saints is the local church. Five bells are hung in the tower for change ringing with the heaviest weighing 8cwt-1qr-4lb (928 lb), and the oldest dating from 1659 cast by Miles Graye III, the tower is affiliated to the Suffolk Guild of Ringers.

Historical writings
In 1870–72, John Marius Wilson's Imperial Gazetteer of England and Wales described the village as:

In 1887, John Bartholomew also wrote an entry on Acton in the Gazetteer of the British Isles with a much shorter description:

Industry
Between 2001 and 2002 the Reliant Robin was produced in the village's industrial estate.

Governance
Acton is part of the Suffolk County Council electoral division of Sudbury East and Waldingfield, and is represented by Philip Faircloth-Mutton (Conservative). 

It is also part of the Babergh District Council electoral ward called Long Melford, and is represented by Councillors Elisabeth Malvisi (Independent) and John Nunn (Independent).

Notable former residents
William Jennens was known as "William the Miser" and the "Acton Miser". Jennens made his money through business in London and loaning money to gamblers, and was Britain's richest man at the time of his death in 1798, but aged 97 he had outlived the nominated executors and beneficiaries under his will. According to the BBC QI series, Jennens vs Jennens commenced in 1798 and was abandoned in 1915 (117 years later) when the legal fees had exhausted the Jennens estate of funds (worth c. £2 million). The case of Jennens v Jennens formed part of the inspiration for the Jarndyce and Jarndyce case at the centre of the plot of Bleak House by Charles Dickens.

Another Acton resident, Catherine Foster, was the last woman to be hanged at Bury St Edmunds, in 1847. At the age of 17 she poisoned her husband John Foster by putting arsenic in his dumplings. The propriety of this case was discussed in the House of Lords and reported in Hansard.

Ronald Blythe, writer, essayist and editor, best known for his work Akenfield: Portrait of an English Village, was born in the village.

Population change

See also
 All Saints Church, Acton

References

External links
 
 

Villages in Suffolk
Civil parishes in Suffolk
Babergh District